A list of films produced by the Bollywood film industry based in Mumbai in 1928:

1928
Notable films of Indian cinema in 1928:

 Devdas, a silent film produced by Eastern Films Syndicate, Calcutta, and directed by Naresh Mitra was the first celluloid version of Sharat Chandra Chattopadhyay's famous story. It starred Phani Burma as Devdas. It was later to be remade eight more times in Indian Cinema with the most popular version still cited as P. C. Barua's Devdas in 1935 starring K. L. Saigal.
 Khoon-e-Nahak was the first Indian screen adaptation of Hamlet. A silent film, it was directed by Athavale based on Mehdi Hasan Ahsan's version of the Hamlet play, written originally for the Parsi theatre.
 Madhuri directed by Rama Choudhary for the Imperial Film Company, and Anarkali, also called Loves of a Mughal Prince directed by Charu Roy and Prafulla Roy for Great Eastern Corporation, were successful films starring Sulochana (Ruby Myers). Both films were made into Talkie versions later, with Madhuri in 1932 and Anarkali in 1935.
 Shiraz directed by Franz Osten and produced by Himanshu Rai, was an adaption of the play, Shiraz: A Romance of India written by Niranjan Pal. Starring Rai in the lead role as Shiraz, it has been referred to as "one of the boldest films".
 Vigathakumaran also called The Lost Child was the first feature length Malayalam film, directed by J. C. Daniel. It was produced by Daniel for his production company Travancore National Pictures.

A-C

D-F

G-I

J-L

M-P

R-S

T-Z

References

External links
Bollywood films of 1928 at IMDb

1928
Bollywood
Films, Bollywood